The Grove is a grade II listed building in Hadley Green Road, Monken Hadley. The house dates from around 1800 but was greatly altered in the 20th century.

References

External links

Grade II listed buildings in the London Borough of Barnet
Houses in the London Borough of Barnet
Monken Hadley